Anatolii Platonovich Prudnikov (Анатолий Платонович Прудников; 14 January 1927 in Ulyanovsk, Russia – 10 January 1999) was a Russian mathematician.

In 1930 the Prudnikov family moved to Samara, where Anatolii passed his Abitur in 1944. He then studied at the Kuibyshev Aviation Institute for three years and at the Kuibyshev Pedagogical Institute for one year before completing his degree qualifying him as a teacher. In 1968 he received his doctorate under the direction of professor Vitalii Arsenievich Ditkin with a thesis entitled On a class of integral transforms of Volterra type and some generalizations of operational calculus. With Ditkin, he published several handbooks on integral transforms and operational calculus. Prudnikov's fame derives mainly from the five-volume work "Integrals and Series" (1981–1992), written with Yuri Aleksandrovich Brychkov and Oleg Igorevich Marichev.

Works 

 1981−1986. (English, translated from the Russian by N. M. Queen), volumes 1–5, Gordon & Breach Science Publishers / CRC Press, 1988–1992, . Second revised edition (Russian), volumes 1–3, Fiziko-Matematicheskaya Literatura, 2003.

References

External links

20th-century Russian mathematicians
1927 births
1999 deaths